Xiaohu may refer to any of the following:

 Tai Xiaohu, male Chinese diver
 Tiger Huang, Taiwanese singer
 Xiaohu Yu, Fellow Member of the IEEE
 Xiaohu FEV, electric city car

See also
 Xiao Hu Dui, Taiwanese boy band
 Xiaohe (disambiguation)